Wrekin College is an independent co-educational boarding and day school located in Wellington, Shropshire, England. It was founded by Sir John Bayley in 1880 and is known as ‘The School in the Garden’ owing to its extensive grounds and playing fields. Part of the Allied Schools, it is also a member of the Headmasters' and Headmistresses' Conference.

History
The school was founded in 1880 as Wellington College by Sir John Bayley.

In 1915 less than 100 acres (0.40 km2) of the Lilleshall Hall estate were purchased from the Duke of Sutherland, who retained the Hall and 50 acres (200,000 m2).

In 1920, it was sold to the Revd Percy Warrington, a Church of England clergyman and renamed Wrekin College. The Rev. Canon Guy Pentreath was a notable headmaster from 1943 to 1952.

Her Majesty Queen Elizabeth II visited Wrekin on Friday 17 March 1967, having opened Shire Hall in Shrewsbury earlier that day. The Headmaster, Robert Dahl (Headmaster. 1952-71), greeted the Queen, and in his study presented a specially bound copy of B.C.W Johnson’s A Brief History of Wrekin College, whilst Head of School, David Franklin (W. 1961-67) was given the honour of presenting a cricket bat for her sons.

Girls were introduced to the sixth form by headmaster Geoffrey Hadden in 1975. It became fully co-educational in the year 1983. There are currently approximately 560 pupils including a number of international boarders. The school admits pupils from the age of eleven.

In 2006, the trust was merged with that of the Old Hall Preparatory School (founded 1845), which moved from its original site on Limekiln Lane to the site of Wrekin College.

Old  Wrekinian Association 
In 1907 the Old Wrekinian Association (OWA) was created by 14 past pupils, it now has almost 6000 members. The purpose of the OWA is to help past students keep in touch with one another and the school. The OWA Record magazine is published twice a year.

Notable alumni

William Dyas (1872-1940), first-class cricketer
Sir Albert Howard (1873-1947), English botanist and pioneer of organic agriculture
Rupert Croft-Cooke MBE (1904–79), novelist and autobiographer
Harry Andrews (1911–1989), British stage and film actor
James Forbes Blythe T.D. (1917-2018) Circuit Judge
William R. P. George (1912–2006), Welsh poet
Sir Peter Gadsden (1929–2006), former Lord Mayor of London (1979), businessman
Brian Epstein (1934–1967), music entrepreneur and manager of The Beatles
Peter Inge, Baron Inge KG, GCB, PC, DL (1935–2022), former Chief of Defence Staff
Guy N. Smith (1939-2020), writer mainly of horror and science fiction
Malcolm Bruce, Baron Bruce (1944- ), former Liberal Democrat MP
Bob Warman (1948 – ), television presenter
Ian Blair, Baron Blair (1953 – ), Metropolitan Police Commissioner (2005–2008)
Brothers Barry (1955- ) and Bryan Jones (1961- ), cricketers
Peter Chelsom (1956- ), film director
John Charles Price, Circuit Judge
Christopher Blagden (1971- ), former British alpine skier who competed at the Albertville Winter Olympic Games, 1992

Footnotes

1.	^ Manwaring, Randle (2002). From Controversy to Co-Existence: Evangelicals in the Church of England 1914–1980. Cambridge: CUP. p. 57.

External links
Official website
Bayley's Children: A History of Wrekin College 1880–2005
UK Boarding Schools Guide ProfileThe Good Schools Guide
The Good Schools Guide

Boarding schools in Shropshire
Private schools in Telford and Wrekin
Member schools of the Headmasters' and Headmistresses' Conference
 
Educational institutions established in 1880
1880 establishments in England
Schools in Telford
Wellington, Shropshire